Zhao Kaimei (born 10 November 1987) is a Chinese goalball player. She won a silver medal at the 2016 Summer Paralympics.

She started playing goalball in 2005.

References

Female goalball players
1987 births
Living people
Paralympic goalball players of China
Paralympic silver medalists for China
Goalball players at the 2016 Summer Paralympics
Medalists at the 2016 Summer Paralympics
Paralympic medalists in goalball
Sportspeople from Yunnan